Dictionary is an application developed by Apple Inc. as a part of macOS.  The application provides definitions and synonyms from various dictionaries, Wikipedia articles and a glossary of Apple-related terms.

Dictionary was introduced in OS X 10.4 with the New Oxford American Dictionary and Oxford American Writer's Thesaurus (as well as the Wikipedia and Apple Dictionary sections). 10.5 added Japanese dictionaries, 10.7 added the British Oxford Dictionary of English, and 10.8 added French, German, Spanish and Chinese.

History

OS X's progenitor, OPENSTEP (and NEXTSTEP) provided similar functionality, called Digital Webster, providing dictionary and thesaurus definitions from Webster's Ninth New Collegiate Dictionary and Webster's Collegiate Thesaurus (termed the "First Digital Edition"). OPENSTEP Services provide lookup from all applications.

Dictionary was first introduced with Mac OS X v10.4 "Tiger" and provided definitions from the New Oxford American Dictionary, 2nd Edition. With Mac OS X 10.7 "Lion", Dictionary was updated to the Third Edition of the New Oxford American Dictionary and the British Oxford Dictionary of English was added.

Functionality

Words can be entered in the search bar by just typing the first few letters. The application will perform an incremental search to show any matching headwords or forms and will try to bypass spelling errors. Clicking on any word in a definition searches for that word in the dictionary again. Almost any word is clickable, except the pronunciations in phonetic characters and numerals.

The Preferences allow a user to select from three different pronunciation schemes, either US English (Diacritical or IPA), or British English (IPA).

The dictionary and thesaurus in Dictionary are in an XML format, but make use of precompiled binary index files to access the XML file directly. Therefore, the lexicon cannot easily be modified. However, the user can add new words to the macOS system-wide spell checker, which uses its own lexicon.

Quick access
 In applications which support "Services", there is an option in the application menu (for example, Safari>Services>Look up in Dictionary) which brings up the Dictionary application and displays the definition of a selected word. The same option appears in the contextual menu after a Control-click on the selected word.
 The key combination  can be used in Cocoa applications which display text – it brings up a small contextual menu-like definition or synonym of the word under the cursor.
 As of Mac OS X Lion, a three finger tap on the trackpad (either the built-in MacBook trackpad or the Magic Trackpad) has the same effect as the  shortcut.
 In applications which support the ability of the user to drag selected text, it is possible to select a word and drop it onto the icon of the Dictionary application in the Dock.
 Dashboard includes a widget for accessing the Dictionary application.
 macOS catches any queries to the dict:/// URI scheme, say from a web browser, and routes them back to the Dictionary application.
 Since OS X Leopard, the dictionary has become tightly integrated with Spotlight, allowing users to view definitions from immediately within the system search.

Other languages

Mac OS X 10.5 (Leopard) added the Japanese-language dictionary Daijisen, Progressive English to Japanese and Progressive Japanese to English dictionaries, and the 25,000-entry thesaurus , all of which are provided by the Japanese publisher Shogakukan. The Japanese dictionaries do not show up by default and must be enabled in Preferences.

In OS X 10.8 Mountain Lion, the Japanese dictionaries were replaced by Super Daijirin and the Wisdom English-Japanese Dictionary. In addition, dictionaries were also added for French (Multidictionnaire de la Langue Française for Macs sold in Europe, or Les Éditions Québec Amérique for Macs sold in America), German (Duden), Spanish (Vox), and Chinese (Standard Dictionary of Contemporary Chinese).

Software such as DictUnifier can be used to add more dictionaries to the application.

List of all pre-installed dictionaries

References

External links
 Install dictionaries on Mac OS X - YouTube

MacOS
Dictionary software
Language software for macOS